Karl Hanft (25 July 1904 – 2 February 1982) was an Austrian film actor.

Selected filmography
 Shock Troop (1934)
 Enemies (1940)
 The Endless Road (1943)
 Tonelli (1943)
 Orient Express (1944)
 Hubertus Castle (1954)
 Salzburg Stories (1957)
 The Beautiful Adventure (1959)
 The Haunted Castle (1960)

References

External links
 

1904 births
1982 deaths
Austrian male film actors
Male actors from Vienna
20th-century Austrian male actors